In This Way They Found Me is an album by the American indie band The Prom.  It was released on January 1, 2001 on Panther Fact Records.

Track listing
"Jean Alexander Waltz"
"Atama Transmission"
"...To the Boat"
"Say What You Want"
"Carrie"
"Walking Back to London"
"She Stays"
"Shiver Holds"
"A Letter Home"
"The South House"

2001 albums
The Prom (band) albums